Gamma Sextantis, Latinized as γ Sextantis, is a binary star system in the equatorial constellation of Sextans. The combined apparent visual magnitude of the system is 5.05, which means it is faintly visible to the naked eye. The annual parallax shift is 11.75 mas, indicating a distance of around 280 light years.

The two components orbit each other with a period of 77.55 years and a high eccentricity of 0.691. The orbital plane is inclined by 145.1° to the line of sight from the Earth. With a visual magnitude of 5.6, the brighter component A is an A-type main sequence star with a stellar classification of A1 V. The fainter companion B has a classification of A4 V with a magnitude of 6.0. Their combined spectral matches a classification of A0/1 V and their angular separation 0,4 arcseconds, so for the observation a telescope with at least 30 centimetres aperture is require.

There is a magnitude 12.28 companion star C at an angular separation of 36.9 arc seconds along a position angle of 333°, as of 2000. This separation has increased from 30.0 arc seconds in 1834. The proper motion of this star differs from the Gamma Sextantis AB system, having components μα = −29 mas/yr and μδ = +5 mas/yr.

References

A-type main-sequence stars
Binary stars
Sextantis, Gamma
Sextans (constellation)
Durchmusterung objects
Sextantis, 08
085558
048437
03909